Bellepop were a Spanish pop music girl group, who formed from five contestants from the 2002 Spanish TV show, Popstars. The group consisted of Elisabeth Jordán, Norma Álvarez, Davinia Arquero, Marta Mansilla and Carmen Miriam Jiménez.

Discography

Albums
Chicas Al Poder (Spain #16, November 25, 2002) Gold (more than 70,000 copies sold)
Chicas Al Poder. Special Edition (Spain N/C, May 13, 2003) (more than 25,000 copies sold)

Singles
From Chicas Al Poder
"La Vida Que Va" - #4
"Si Pides Más" - #7

From Chicas Al Poder. Special Edition
"Chicas Al Poder" - #3
"Esta Noche Mando Yo" - #16

References

External links
 Marta Mansilla Official site
 Davinia Arquero Dae Official site

Spanish musical groups
Spanish girl groups